= Barkhedi Abdulla =

- village
- Location within Madhya Pradesh Location within India
- Coordinates: 23.387006°N 77.494868°E
- Country: India
- State: Madhya Pradesh
- District: Bhopal
- Tehsil: Huzur

Population (2011)
  - Total: 951
- Time zone: UTC+5:30 (IST)
- ISO 3166 code: MP-IN
- Census code: 482410

Barkhedi Abdulla is a village in the Bhopal district of Madhya Pradesh, India. It is located in the Huzur tehsil.

== Demographics ==
According to the 2011 census of India, Barkhedi Abdulla has 169 households. The effective literacy rate (i.e. the literacy rate of population excluding children aged 6 and below) is 47.84%.

Demographics (2011 Census)
	Total	Male	Female
Population	951	478	473
Children aged below 6 years	186	96	90
Scheduled caste	98	47	51
Scheduled tribe	0	0	0
Literates	366	203	163
Workers (all)	434	219	215
Main workers (total)	280	147	133
Main workers: Cultivators	4	4	0
Main workers: Agricultural labourers	268	138	130
Main workers: Household industry workers	0	0	0
Main workers: Other	8	5	3
Marginal workers (total)	154	72	82
Marginal workers: Cultivators	5	2	3
Marginal workers: Agricultural labourers	128	57	71
Marginal workers: Household industry workers	1	1	0
Marginal workers: Others	20	12	8
Non-workers	517	259	258
